The 2002 United States Senate election in Nebraska was held on November 5, 2002. Incumbent Republican U.S. Senator Chuck Hagel won re-election to a second term.

Democratic primary

Candidates 
 Charlie A. Matulka, construction worker
 Al Hamburg, perennial candidate

Results

Libertarian primary

Candidates 
 John J. Graziano, businessman

Results

Republican primary

Candidates 
 Chuck Hagel, incumbent U.S. Senator

Results

General election

Candidates 
 Phil Chase (I)
 John Graziano (L), businessman
 Chuck Hagel (R), incumbent U.S. Senator
 Charlie Matulka (D), construction worker

Predictions

Results

See also 
 2002 United States Senate elections

References 

Nebraska
2002
2002 Nebraska elections